"Fox on the Run" is a song by the British glam rock band Sweet, first recorded in 1974. It was the first Sweet single written by the band, rather than producers Nicky Chinn and Mike Chapman, and was their 14th single overall. The song became the best charting single in Australia in 1975, with six weeks at number one.

Two versions were recorded by Sweet. The original version was produced by Mike Chapman in association with Nicky Chinn on the European version of the 1974 album Desolation Boulevard. Sweet also recorded and produced a more pop-oriented version as a 7" single in 1975, which is the more familiar version of the song. The 1975 single version was included on the Capitol Records version of Desolation Boulevard.

The song's inclusion in the trailer for Guardians of the Galaxy Vol. 2 led to the song reaching number one on the iTunes Rock Chart in late 2016.

Background
"Fox" being slang for an attractive woman, the lyrics are apparently about one of the band's groupies; Bomp! called the song "a definitive hard-rock bubblegum record" and "one of the last glitter classics".

Chart performance

Weekly charts

Year-end charts

Personnel 
 Brian Connolly – lead vocals
 Steve Priest – bass, lead vocal, backing vocals
 Andy Scott – guitars, synthesizer, backing vocals
 Mick Tucker – drums, percussion, backing vocals

Scorpions version

"Fuchs geh' voran" is a German cover version of the song with lyrics about a fox being chased by hunters to sell its fur. It was released as a single in 1975 by the German rock band Scorpions as The Hunters. The B-side also features a German cover version of another Sweet song, "Action", as "Wenn es richtig losgeht".

Other covers

Many artists and groups have covered this song, including: 
The Regrettes (for the AV Undercover series) 
Eric Singer
Girlschool
Red Hot Chili Peppers
You Am I
Mad Max
Deadsy
Frankenstein Drag Queens from Planet 13
Ace Frehley
Make-Up
The Academy Is...
Sweet Savage
Nip Drivers for the Desperate Teenage Lovedolls soundtrack. 
A 1986 recording by The Replacements is featured on the 2017 live album For Sale: Live at Maxwell's 1986.

Popular culture
The song appears in numerous films, including: Dazed and Confused, Detroit Rock City,  When in Rome, Catch .44, Lords of Dogtown, The Goods: Live Hard, Sell Hard, and The Black Phone.
The song was used in the trailer for Guardians of the Galaxy Vol. 2.
The song was used in the opening credits of the Australian film Kath & Kimderella starring Gina Riley and Jane Turner. It was also used in the series "Kath and Kim" in the season 3, episode 7 titled "Foxy on the Run".
The song was used in the 2023 Peacock Television series Poker Face season 1 episode 2 titled "The Night Shift"..

See also
List of number-one singles in Australia during the 1970s
List of number-one hits of 1975 (Germany)

References

External links
 

The Sweet songs
1974 songs
1975 singles
Number-one singles in Australia
Number-one singles in Germany
Number-one singles in South Africa
Songs written by Andy Scott (guitarist)
Songs written by Brian Connolly
Songs written by Steve Priest
Songs written by Mick Tucker
Song recordings produced by Mike Chapman
British power pop songs